Joanne Brackeen (born Joanne Grogan; July 26, 1938) is an American jazz pianist and music educator.

Music career
Brackeen was born in Ventura, California, United States, and attended the Los Angeles Conservatory of Music. She was a fan of pop pianist Frankie Carle before she became enamored with the music of Charlie Parker. In the 1950s she performed with Dexter Gordon, Teddy Edwards, and Charles Brackeen. She and Brackeen married and moved to New York City in 1965. She performed with Chick Corea, Freddie McCoy, and Ornette Coleman.

She played with Joe Henderson (1972–75) and Stan Getz (1975–77) before leading her own trio and quartet. She established herself as a cutting-edge pianist and composer through her appearances around the world, and her solo performances also established her reputation as an innovative and dynamic pianist. Her trios featured such noted players as Clint Houston, Eddie Gómez, John Patitucci, Jack DeJohnette, Cecil McBee and Billy Hart.

She served on the grant panel for the National Endowment for the Arts, toured the Middle East with the US State Department as sponsor, and had solo performances at Carnegie Hall.

She has recorded over 20 albums as a lead musician. She is currently a professor at the Berklee College of Music and at The New School.

Awards
 2018 NEA Jazz Masters

Discography

As leader

As sideperson
With Arkadia Jazz All Stars
Thank You, Duke!
With Art Blakey
Jazz Messengers '70 (Catalyst, 1970) 
With Stan Getz
Getz/Gilberto '76 (Resonance, 1976 [2016]) with João Gilberto
Live at Montmartre (SteepleChase, 1977)
With Freddie McCoy
Funk Drops (Prestige, 1966)
Peas 'n' Rice (Prestige, 1967)
Beans & Greens (Prestige, 1967)
Soul Yogi (Prestige, 1968)
With Buddy Terry
Pure Dynamite (Mainstream, 1972)
With Freddie Hubbard
Sweet Return (Atlantic, 1983)

References

External links 
 Official site
 Joanne Brackeen on Marian McPartland's Piano Jazz on NPR
 Berklee School of Music profile
 "A Woman of Many Hats", interview

1938 births
Living people
American jazz pianists
Berklee College of Music faculty
The New School faculty
People from Greater Los Angeles
Women jazz pianists
Antilles Records artists
MPS Records artists
Timeless Records artists
Columbia Records artists
American jazz educators
California Institute of the Arts alumni
Jazz musicians from New York (state)
20th-century American women pianists
20th-century American pianists
21st-century American women pianists
21st-century American pianists
Women music educators
American women academics